Erich Bachem (12 August 1906, in Mülheim an der Ruhr – 25 March 1960) was a German engineer.

In the 1930s Erich Bachem designed the Aero-Sport camping trailer built from plywood by the glider company Wolf Hirth in Kirchheim unter Teck. Until 1942 Bachem served as technical director for the aircraft manufacturer Fieseler. In February 1942 he founded Bachem-Werke GmbH, a supplier of spare parts for the aircraft industry, in Waldsee, Baden-Württemberg.

In 1944, he designed for the SS the vertical take-off manned rocket plane Bachem Ba 349 Natter. The only manned test flight on 1 March 1945 ended with pilot Lothar Sieber being killed.

In 1947/48 Erich Bachem left Germany through Denmark and Sweden in order to settle in Argentina. Possibly he wished to escape US agents who planned to send him to the USA with Wernher von Braun's group as part of Operation Overcast. In Argentina, among other things, he constructed a factory for guitars with interchangeable bottoms.

In 1952 Bachem returned to Germany to become technical director for the company of his father-in-law Heinrich Wilhelm Schwarz, Ruhrthaler Maschinenfabrik Schwarz & Dyckerhoff GmbH, in Mülheim. There he developed the modern streamlined mine locomotive Ruhrthaler Vollsicht along with various other pieces of mining machinery and long-distance diesel locomotives. He occupied this position until his untimely death.

From 1957, together with Erwin Hymer at Hymer, he designed camping trailers sold as Eriba (Erich Bachem, or possibly Erika Bachem after his wife) with names like Troll, Puck, Touring, Nova.

Publications
 Die Praxis des Leistungs-Segelfliegens. Berlin: Volckmann 1932, 2. Auflage 1936
 Das Problem des Schnellstfluges. Stuttgart: Franckh 1933
 Beitrag in: Probleme aus der astronautischen Grundlagenforschung, hrsg. v. Heinz H. Koelle, 1952

References

Bibliography
Gooden, Brett. Natter: Manned Missile of the Third Reich: Historic Step to Human Spaceflight. Rundle Mall, Australia: Brett Gooden, 2019. 
 Nachrufartikel in: Wissenschaftliche Gesellschaft für Luft- und Raumfahrt: Jahrbuch, Jg. 1960, S. 479
 Volker Hammermeister, Die Legende lebt, in: Caravaning, Heft 2/2007, S. 12f (auch online

External links
 Erich Bachem at astronautix.com
 Eriba France
 Abfangjagdflugzeug Bachem Ba 349 "Natter"
 U.S. Intelligence Report Photos

Bachem aircraft
Aircraft designers
Engineers from North Rhine-Westphalia
1906 births
1960 deaths
People from Mülheim